Calalang is a surname. Notable people with the surname include: 

Alfonso Calalang, Filipino banker
Ciriaco Calalang (1951–2018), Filipino academic and politician
Jessica Calalang (born 1995), American pair skater

Tagalog-language surnames